Teminius is a genus of spiders in the family Miturgidae. It was first described in 1887 by Keyserling. , it contains 5 species.

References

Miturgidae
Araneomorphae genera
Spiders of North America
Spiders of South America
Taxa named by Eugen von Keyserling